Hispania Clásica, known from 1914 to 1996 as Conciertos Daniel, is a classical music concert promotion agency active in Europe and in the Americas.  The agency's primary base is in Madrid, Spain.

2008 is Hispania Clásica's centennial year.  It was founded in Berlin in 1908 as Konzertdirektion H. Daniel by Cuban-born impresario Ernesto de Quesada.  As World War I was beginning in 1914, de Quesada moved his agency to Madrid and renamed it Conciertos Daniel.

Ernesto de Quesada's youngest son, Ricardo de Quesada,  heading the agency in Madrid after the death of his father in 1972, reorganized the agency in 1996 and renamed it Hispania Clásica; he has recently (2007) retired.  One of the founder's grandsons, Enrique de Quesada, Jr. in Caracas, Venezuela,  is the agency director for Latin America.  Hispania Clásica also has offices in Mexico City and in Bogotá, Colombia.

Carlos Izcaray, the young Venezuelan cellist  and conductor who was a subject of Human Rights Watch and Amnesty International concern in 2004,  and who was a 2007 fellow of the elite American Academy of Conducting under the direction of David Zinman at the Aspen Music Festival and School,  is one of the Hispania Clásica artists.

Hispania Clásica is a member of the European Association of Artist Managers (AEAA), which was founded in Paris, France in 1947.

Artists
The artists who have worked with the agency during its first ten decades include:

References

External links
 Conciertos Daniel / Hispania Clásica Artists.
 Conciertos Daniel / Hispania Clásica Photogallery.

Music promoters
Talent managers
Arts managers